The first season of Knight Rider, an American television series, debuted on September 26, 1982, and ended on May 6, 1983. It aired on NBC. The region 1 DVD was released on August 3, 2004.

Knight Rider had a 2-hour premiere on NBC, airing at 8PM on Sunday night. The show was put up against Dallas, and would eventually move NBC out of third place in the network race. No other show had ever survived that time slot. The show eventually aired on Friday nights, and in December 1982 became the second-highest-rated show of its day; M*A*SH was number 1. 

The show was renewed for a second season during the filming of "Short Notice".

Season 1

The pilot episode featured Larry Anderson as Michael Long. Anderson is replaced by Hasselhoff after Michael Long was shot in the Nevada desert. Hasselhoff's voice is dubbed over Anderson's for all of his lines. Anderson elected to remain uncredited in the episode. 

At the end of Season 1, lead actress Patricia McPherson was fired from the show due to a falling out with producer Robert Foster, and her character was written out of the show. McPherson was replaced by Rebecca Holden in the second season. Hasselhoff was reportedly angry about McPherson's firing, but was in no position to fight the network or the show's producers. Holden left the show at the end of season two, and McPherson returned for season 3.

David Hasselhoff's then-girlfriend, Catherine Hickland, appeared in episode 19, "White Bird," as Michael Long's ex-fiancée Stevie Mason. Hickland also helped to write the episode. 

At the end of season 1 during the studio wrap party, Hasselhoff celebrated Hickland's birthday. A cake was presented with a replica of K.I.T.T. sitting on top. Written in icing were the words "Look Under the Hood." An engagement ring had been placed under the hood, and Hasselhoff proposed.

Hickland later returned to the show twice, on season two's "Let it Be Me", and season four's "The Scent of Roses."

Cast
 David Hasselhoff as Michael Knight
 William Daniels as the voice of KITT (Knight Industries Two Thousand) (uncredited)
 Edward Mulhare as Devon Miles
 Patricia McPherson as Dr. Bonnie Barstow
 Richard Basehart as Wilton Knight, and the voiceover of Wilton Knight

Episodes

References

External links 
 
 

 
1982 American television seasons
1983 American television seasons
Knight Rider (1982 TV series) seasons